Blue Dragon may refer to:

Biology
 Glaucus atlanticus, a shell-less marine gastropod mollusc in the family Glaucidae
 Glaucus marginatus, a shell-less marine gastropod mollusc in the family Glaucidae
 Pteraeolidia ianthina, a shell-less marine gastropod mollusc in the family Facelinidae

Media

Franchise
 Blue Dragon franchise of video games, manga and anime
 Blue Dragon (video game), a 2006 video game for the Xbox 360.
 Blue Dragon (manga), also known as Blue Dragon Ral Ω Grad, a manga adaptation of the video game series
 Blue Dragon (TV series), an anime adaptation of the video game series

Books
 Blue Dragon, a novel in The Dark Heavens trilogy by Kylie Chan
 The Blue Dragon: A Robert Strand Mystery, a novella by Ronald Tierney
 The Blue Dragon, a novel by Robert Lepage, Marie Michaud, and Fred Jourdain
 The Blue Dragon, a novel by Kirk Munroe
 Blue Dragon, a tavern in Charles Dickens' novel Martin Chuzzlewit

Tabletop game
 Blue dragon (Dungeons & Dragons), a type of dragon in the Dungeons & Dragons role-playing game

Television and film
 The Blue Dragon, a 1919 German silent film directed by Harry Piel
 Blue Dragon Film Awards, an annual South Korean film awards ceremony

Sports
 Belgrade Blue Dragons, an American football club based in Belgrade, Serbia
 Cardiff City Blue Dragons, former Rugby League team in Wales 
 Hutchinson Blue Dragons, sports teams for Hutchinson Community College in Hutchinson, Kansas, U.S.

Other
 BlueDragon, a ColdFusion Markup Language (CFML) engine
 Azure Dragon, also known as Blue Dragon (蒼龍 Cānglóng), one of the Dragon Kings of the Four Seas in Chinese religion
 Blue Dragon (military unit), nickname of 2nd Marine Brigade of Republic of Korea Marine Corps
 Odeleite River, Portugal

See also
 Blue Dragon Children's Foundation, a Non Governmental Organisation based in Hanoi, Vietnam focused on getting children out of the poverty cycle
 Dragon Bleu, a French brand of vodka